Cinda Firestone Fox (born July 28, 1948) is an American film director. She is best known for her 1974 film Attica about the 1971 Attica Prison riot, which she made when she was 23 years old.

Films
Attica 1974
South Beach
Retirement
Mountain People

References

External links
 Cinda Firestone on ImDB

1948 births
Living people
American women film directors
American film directors
21st-century American women